Plácido Domingo has received numerous awards and honors, including:

Grammy Award
 1971: Principal Soloist for Best Opera Recording for Verdi: Aida
 1974: Principal Soloist for Best Opera Recording for G. Puccini: La bohème
 1983: Principal Soloist for Best Opera Recording for Verdi: La traviata
 1984: Principal Soloist for Best Opera Recording for Bizet: Carmen
 1984: Best Latin Pop Performance for Always in My Heart (Siempre en mi corazon)
 1988: Principal Soloist for Best Opera Recording for Wagner: Lohengrin
 1990: Best Classical Vocal Performance for Carreras Domingo Pavarotti in Concert
 1992: Principal Soloist for Best Opera Recording for Strauss: Die Frau ohne Schatten
 2000: Best Mexican-American Performance for 100 Years of Mariachi

Latin Grammy Award
 2000: Best Classical Album for T. Breton: La Dolores
 2001: Best Classical Album for I. Albéniz: Merlin
 2008: Best Classical Album for various composers: Pasión Española
 2010: Latin Recording Academy Person of the Year
 2014: Best Classical Album for Verdi: Baritone Arias

Government and organization honors
Austria
 Austrian Cross of Honour for Science and Art, 1st class (1992)
 Kammersänger und Ehrenmitglied der Wiener Staatsoper
 Goldenes Ehrenzeichen für Verdienste um das Land Wien – 2007
 Grand Decoration of Honour in Silver for Services to the Republic of Austria (2007)

France
 Chevalier of the Légion d'honneur
 Commandeur of the Ordre des Arts et des Lettres
 Grande Médaille de la Ville de Paris
 Commandeur of the Légion d'Honneur – March 2002

 Italy
 Grand Officer of the Order of Merit of the Italian Republic – 3 April 1991
 Knight Grand Cross Order of Merit of the Italian Republic – 2 April 1997

Japan
 Praemium Imperiale - 2013

Mexico
 Orden del Águila Azteca, (Mexico).

Monaco
 Commander of the Order of Cultural Merit (November 1999)

Spain
 Premio Príncipe de Asturias – 18 October 1991
 Knight Grand Cross of the Order of Civil Merit – 20 September 2002
 Knight Grand Cross of the Order of Arts and Letters of Spain – 14 January 2011
 Knight Grand Cross of the Order of Isabella the Catholic – 20 January 2011
 Knight Grand Cross of the Civil Order of Alfonso X, the Wise – 7 October 2016

Sweden
 Birgit Nilsson Prize, inaugural recipient (20 February 2009)

Portugal
 Knight Grand Cross of the Order of Prince Henry – 1 July 1998
 Knight Grand Cross of the Order of Public Instruction – 31 August 2018 

United Kingdom
 Honorary Knight Commander of the Order of the British Empire (KBE) – October 2002

USA
 Kennedy Center Honors – 3 December 2000
 The Presidential Medal of Freedom – 9 July 2002

Venezuela
 Keys to the city of Caracas - September 2009 

Other countries
 Knight Grand Cross OMRI (Italy) – 2 April 1997
 Cavalliere di Malta (Malta)
 Order of the Cedars (Lebanon) (2004)
 Medal of Honour (Oman) - October 2011

NPO
 UNICEF Socio de Honor (UNICEF)

Honorary Doctorates
 Royal Northern College of Music, England (1982)
 Philadelphia College of Performing Arts, USA (1982)
 Oklahoma City University, USA (1984)
 Universidad Complutense de Madrid, Spain (1989)
 New York University, USA (1990)
 Georgetown University, USA (1992)
 Washington College of Chestertown, USA (2000)
 Anáhuac University, Mexico (2001)
 Chopin Music Academy, Poland (2003)
 Oxford University, England (2003)
 California State University, Stanislaus, USA (2010)
 Harvard University, USA (2011)
 Universidad Europea de Madrid, Spain (2013)
 University of Murcia, Spain (2014)
 Berklee College of Music, USA (2014) 
 University of Salamanca, Spain (2015)
 Manhattan School of Music, USA (2018)

Other entertainment awards and appreciation
 In the 1980s, a Sesame Street muppet was named in his honor: Placido Flamingo.
 A star on the Hollywood Walk of Fame – 1993 (Location: Domingo, Placido LT 7000 Hollywood Blvd)
The Excellence Award at the 1991 Lo Nuestro Awards.
 A star on the Kunstmeile (Art Mile) in Vienna (2008)
 Sociedad General de Autores Española (Best Lyric Singer of the Year 1997) for his role in the world premiere of "Divinas Palabras" (1997)
 Association of Argentinian Music Critics (Best Male Singer in 1997) for “Samson and Dalila" (1997)
 Baltika Grand Prix for Outstanding Achievement (June 1998)
 American Latina Media Arts (ALMA) Awards (Outstanding Performances By An Individual or Act in A Variety) (1998)
 Hispanic Heritage Award for Arts (September 1999)
 Great Prize of the International Music Press (September 2000)
 The Ella Award, the Society of Singers Lifetime Achievement Award (2002) 
 Opera News Award for distinguished achievement, inaugural recipient, 2005
 Classical BRIT Awards (2006) (Critics' Award for Tristan und Isolde and Lifetime Achievement Award
 Domingo was named "The King of singers" in BBC Music Magazine for April 2008 issue. He was voted as the greatest tenor in history by 16 renowned opera critics in a quest to find the world top 20 operatic tenors. The headline of the page stated: "The king of the singers – The critics number 1 choice. Domingo is that rarest vocal phenomena, a tenor who uses his voice in the service of re-creating great art, and not as a thrilling end in itself."
 BAMBI award in 1985 and 2008
 In 2009 Domingo was appointed the inaugural Washington Ambassador to the Arts by Guide for the Arts.
 Plácido Domingo is an Honorary Member of the Royal Academy of Music (Hon Ram) since 2000.
 The King of Sweden awarded Plácido Domingo with the first Birgit Nilsson Prize in October 2009. With one million dollars, it is the biggest prize in classical music.
 Also in October 2009, he received the German Echo Award for Lifetime Achievement.
Anton Coppola Excellence in the Arts Award (2011 recipient)

See also
 List of recordings by Plácido Domingo
 The Three Tenors
 Christmas in Vienna I, II, III, and VI
 Grammy Award for Best Opera Recording
 :Category:Plácido Domingo albums

References

External links 

 Official website
 Plácido Domingo International Operalia Opera Singer Contest
 World Tour Homepage
 Discography on EMI Classics website
 Discography on DG Classics website
 Opera is expensive, singers are cheap, Plácido Domingo about too small Operas, Casting-Singers as Paul Potts and the humility before a great career (Interview by Nahuel Lopez in German, Frankfurter Allgemeine Sonntagszeitung, 17 March 2009)
 Interview with Domingo from The Guardian, 10 July 2005
 Biography at the Kennedy Center
 Plácido Domingo's video of concerts and Opera from YouTube.com
 Guardian article detailing his switch to baritone.
History of the Tenor - Sound Clips and Narration

Domingo, Plácido